Timo Vuorensola (born 29 November 1979) is a Finnish film director, singer and actor. He has directed Star Wreck movies Star Wreck V: Lost Contact, and Star Wreck: In the Pirkinning, created by Samuli Torssonen. Vuorensola plays Lieutenant Dwarf in the films. He also directed the film Iron Sky and its sequel, The Coming Race. He is also the lead vocalist and co-founder of dark industrial band Älymystö. He has also yet to fulfil his indiegogo backers for the sequel to iron sky 2: the coming race. 

Jeepers Creepers: Reborn, a reboot of the cult film series, is the first American film directed by Vuorensola.

Filmography

Films

 1996: Star Wreck IV: The Kilpailu
 1997: Star Wreck V: Lost Contact
 2005: Star Wreck: In the Pirkinning
 2012: Iron Sky
 2019: Iron Sky: The Coming Race
 2022: Jeepers Creepers: Reborn
 TBA: The Ark: An Iron Sky Story
 TBA: 97 Minutes

Film projects
 TBA: I Killed Adolf Hitler
 Cancelled: Jeremiah Harm

Awards and nominations
Iron Sky (2012)
2012: Winner of the audience award Pegasus and the jury-prize Silver Méliès at the Brussels International Fantastic Film Festival
2012: Nomination for the grand prize The Golden Raven statuette at the Brussels International Fantastic Film Festival
2012: Audience Award & Special Jury Mention at Utopiales Science Fiction Festival

References

External links

 
 Timo Vuorensola director of Iron Sky - interview filmneweurope.com
 interview, at comicnews.info
 Official website of the band Älymystö
 Jeremiah Harm site

1979 births
Living people
Male actors from Helsinki
Finnish film directors
Finnish parodists
Comedy film directors
Parody film directors
English-language film directors
German-language film directors